The Fur or For languages constitute a small, closely related family, which is a proposed member of the Nilo-Saharan family. Its members are:

Fur in western Sudan with around 750,000 speakers in 2004.
Amdang (also called Mimi) in eastern Chad with around 40,000 speakers in 2000.

References

External links
 Fur languages at Ethnologue (23rd ed., 2020).

 
Language families